The Strategic Trade Act 2010 is a law enacted by the Malaysia government in 2010 to control the export of sensitive technology and materials in order to combat terrorism, nuclear proliferation, and the spread of weapons of mass destruction.

The American government congratulated Malaysian Prime Minister Najib Razak on the legislation in an official statement from the White House.

Structure
The Strategic Trade Act 2010, in its current form (as of 2010), consists of 6 Parts containing 57 sections and 1 schedule (including no amendment).
 Part I: Preliminary
 Part II: Appointment and Powers of Strategic Trade Collectors
 Part III: Control of Strategic Items, Unlisted Items and Restricted Activities
 Part IV: Permit and Registration
 Part V: Enforcement
 Part VI: General
 Schedule

Regulation of strategic items, unlisted items and restricted activities
The written laws related to the regulation of strategic items, unlisted items and restricted activities are as follows:

1. Animals Act 1953 [Act 647]

2. Atomic Energy Licensing Act 1984 [Act 304]

3. Chemical Weapons Convention Act 2005 [Act 641]

4. Customs Act 1967 [Act 235]

5. Pesticides Act 1974 [Act 149]

6. Plant Quarantine Act 1976 [Act 167]

7. Prevention and Control of Infectious Diseases Act 1988 [Act 342]

8. Protection of New Plant Varieties Act 2004 [Act 634]

References

External links
 Strategic Trade Act 2010 

Malaysian federal legislation
2010 in Malaysian law